San Didero is a comune (municipality) in the Metropolitan City of Turin in the Italian region Piedmont, located about 40 km west of Turin in the Val di Susa.

References

Cities and towns in Piedmont